Knema scortechinii is a species of plant in the family Myristicaceae. It is a tree endemic to Peninsular Malaysia.

References

scortechinii
Endemic flora of Peninsular Malaysia
Trees of Peninsular Malaysia
Least concern plants
Taxonomy articles created by Polbot
Taxa named by James Sinclair (botanist)